NTone was a sister imprint to the independent record label, Ninja Tune. The imprint was based in London, United Kingdom and specialised in experimental electronic music. The label was originally called "Ninja Tone", but it was felt this was too similar to "Ninja Tune". Its first release was AntiStatic (TONE 1) by Hex released in February 1994, and its last was Sunflower Girl (NTONE 45) by Neotropic in 2001.

Artists

 2 Player
 Animals on Wheels
 Cabbageboy (Si Begg)
 Drome (Bernd Friedmann)
 Fink
 Flanger
 Hex
 Hexstatic
 Journeyman
 Juryman
 Neotropic (Riz Maslen)
 Omnium (Snap Ant)
 Purr (Funki Porcini)
 Real Life
 Rhys Chatham
 Transcend

Compilation albums
 Tone Tales from Tomorrow (1994, Cat. no: NTONE CD 05)
 Tone Tales from Tomorrow Too (1996, Cat. no: NTONE CD 09)

See also
 List of record labels
 List of independent UK record labels

References

External links
 
 Ntone Discography at Kompaktkiste.de
 Official Animals on Wheels site
 Official Si Begg (Cabbageboy) site
 Official Fink site
 Official Hexstatic site
 Reviews at Sonomu.net

British independent record labels
Record labels established in 1994
Electronic music record labels
Experimental music record labels